Japanese language education in Russia formally dates back to December 1701 or January 1702, when Dembei, a shipwrecked Japanese merchant, was taken to Moscow and ordered to begin teaching the language as soon as possible. A 2006 survey by the Japan Foundation found 451 teachers teaching the language to 9,644 students at 143 institutions; the number of students had grown by 4.8% since the previous year. Aside from one Japanese-medium school serving Japanese people in Russia (the Japanese School in Moscow, founded in 1965), virtually all Japanese language education in Russia throughout history has been aimed at non-native speakers.

History

Tsarist Russia

Russian interest in Japan dated back to the early 17th century, when Flemish cartographer Gerardus Mercator's descriptions of Japan were translated into Russian. (The Russian ambassador to China at the time, Nikolai Spathari, also tried to gather information about Japan.) However, the first real knowledge of the Japanese language would come from Dembei, a shipwrecked native of Japan who had become stranded on the Kamchatka Peninsula. Despite repeated protests and an expressed desire to return to Japan, Dembei was taken to Moscow by Vladimir Atlasov in December 1701 or January 1702 and ordered by Peter the Great to teach Japanese to a small group of young Russian men. It is believed he finally began teaching in 1705. Japanese education in Russia continued throughout the 18th century, using as teachers Japanese fishermen who, like Denbei, drifted ashore in the Russian Far East and, due to the sakoku policy of the Tokugawa Shogunate, found themselves unable to return to Japan. However, Japanese studies were not included in the official programmes of Russian universities until the 1898 establishment of the Department of Japanese Philology at Saint Petersburg University. Soon afterwards, Serge Elisséeff would become the first Russian to undergo higher education in Japan, graduating from Tokyo Imperial University in 1912; however, he did not return to Russia, but instead remained overseas, taking up a post at the Sorbonne in 1917.

Soviet era

Japanese language education suffered setbacks during the Great Purge. Notable scholars killed during this period include Yevgeny Polivanov, designer of the official system for the Cyrillization of Japanese, and Nikolai Nevskii, who specialised in Okinawan studies. Later, during the Nikita Khrushchev era, increasing numbers of Russians went back to Japan as international students, but few returned to become teachers, due to the low salaries.

After the Soviet breakup
In the Russian census of 2002, 24,787 people claimed knowledge of the Japanese language, making it the 65th-most known language (behind Vietnamese and ahead of Andian). With only 835 people claiming Japanese ethnicity (nationality) in that census, Japanese is thus one of only two East Asian languages in Russia for which the population of speakers outnumbers the population of the ethnic group to which the language belongs. The other such language is Chinese, which has 59,235 speakers in Russia and is the 44th-most known language, but only 34,577 members of the nationality.

Most students chose Japanese for economic rather than cultural reasons. Study of the language is noted as being most popular in the Russian Far East, especially among Sakhalin Koreans. Also, despite the dispute between Russia and Japan over the Kuril islands, increasing numbers of Russian people in the southernmost islands, such as Shikotan and Kunashiri, are studying Japanese for purposes of daily communication with Japanese, with whom they come into frequent contact.

Russophone learners of Japanese make both phonological and grammatical errors when speaking the language, due to cross-linguistic interference from Russian.

Standardised testing
The Japanese Language Proficiency Test has been offered in Russia since 1998, at first only in Moscow, but since 2001, in Vladivostok as well. Since the test's introduction, the number of examinees has risen by an average of 21% per year. In 2006, the list of test sites was further expanded to include Khabarovsk, Novosibirsk, and Yuzhno-Sakhalinsk; the number of examinees also showed record growth, more than doubling as compared to the previous year. However, JETRO's Business Japanese Test was not offered in Russia or any other former Soviet Union member state .

Result for 2013, in 8 sites, June + December sessions :
N1: 213
N2: 639
N3: 838
N4: 1078
N5: 1316
Total: 4084
(The number of levels increased to 5 in 2009)

See also
Cyrillization of Japanese
Languages of Russia
List of languages of Russia
Nikolai Rezanov, first Russian ambassador to Japan and author of an early Russian-Japanese lexicon
Japanese School in Moscow, which is not a Japanese as a foreign language school, but instead a school for Japanese expatriates
Russians in Japan
Chinese as a foreign language

References

Further reading

External links
 Japanese School in Moscow
 Japan-Russia Youth Exchange

Education in Russia
Russia
Japan–Russia relations
Language education in Russia